Barends is a Dutch patronymic surname. (son of "Barend"). People with this name include:

 Brady Barends (born 1989), South African cricketer
 David Barends (fl. 1970-83), South African rugby player
 Indy Barends (born 1972), Indonesian television host
 NatHalie Braun Barends, German-born multi-media artist

See also
 Barend (surname)
 Bar-end shift levers
 Bar ends, extensions typically fitted to the ends of straight bicycle handlebars 
 Bar End, an area of Winchester, Hampshire, England 

Dutch-language surnames
Patronymic surnames
Surnames from given names